Jörg Ewald Dähler (16 March 1933 –  3 November 2018), is a Swiss conductor, harpsichordist, forte piano player and composer.

Life 
Born in Bern, Dähler, son of the reformed pastor Karl Walter Dähler (1903-1986), grew up in Langnau im Emmental. He then attended the teacher training college in Hofwil. At the Hochschule für Musik in Bern, he graduated as a teacher of piano and then studied harpsichord at the Musikhochschule in Freiburg im Breisgau.

He also teaches Basso continuo, chamber music and choral conducting at the Berne Conservatory of Music and at the Schola Cantorum Basiliensis. Among his pupils are Olive Emil Wetter, Hans Eugen Frischknecht. From 1965 to 1998, he conducted concerts in Bern, at the Bätterkinden Gasthof Krone and the Hindelbank castle and from 1974 onwards, the Bern Chamber Choir.

He also practised drawing. He illustrated two collections of short stories by his father, written in the German dialect of Bern. : "Momou das git’s" (Langnau im Emmental, 1983) and Ou das het’s ggä (idem, 1986).

Works 
 Das Passionsgeschehen nach dem Evangelisten Lukas. Für 1–8-stimmig gemischten Chor, Sprecher, Posaunenquartett und Orgel. 1987. 
 En tant qu'éditeur: 
 Tomaso Albinoni, Concerto en ré majeur op. 7 n° 1
 François Devienne, 6 Sonates, opus 24 pour basson et basse continue - Accolade-Musikverlag.
 Galuppi, Magnificat en sol
 Vivaldi, Concerto en la majeur
 Vivaldi, Concerto pour 2 trompettes, cordes et basse continue en do majeur

Recordings 
 Bach, Flute Sonata in E major, BWV 1035 - Peter Lukas Graf, flute (Claves Records CD 50-401)
 Bach, Goldberg Variations (1986, Claves)
 Devienne, Six Sonatas for bassoon and basso continuo (Claves CD 50-9207)
 Galuppi, Musiche Veneziane, Concerti e Sinfonie (1976, Claves CD 508306) 
 Keiser, Markus Passion - Gemischter Chor Zweisimmen (Claves)
 Schubert, Winterreise - Ernst Haefliger, tenor (September 1980, Claves) 
 Schubert, Schwanengesang - Ernst Haefliger, tenor (1985, Claves) 
 Schubert, Sonatas in A major and A minor D 664 - on a Brodmann piano, 1820 (March 1978, Claves) 
 Schubert, Sonatas D 605a, D 960 (1980, Claves) 
 Schubert, Impromptus, op. 90 and 142 (July 1975, Claves) 
 Schubert, Trios with piano D 898 and D 28 (12-15 novembre 1990, Claves) 
 Vivaldi, Concerto in B minor op. 3 N 10 for 4 violins, cello, strings and harpsichord (1970, Claves) on Music Brain

References

External links 
 
 

1933 births
2018 deaths
People from Bern
Swiss harpsichordists
Fortepianists
Swiss conductors (music)
20th-century hymnwriters